Marvel Universe Live!, stylized as Marvel Universe LIVE!, is a touring live action arena show featuring Marvel Comics characters by Feld Entertainment. So far there have been two shows under the banner, the original and "Age of Heroes".

Marvel's previous licensed theatrical show, Spider-Man: Turn Off the Dark, a Broadway musical, was plagued by several injuries. The movie licenses currently do not restrict the licensed Marvel characters' appearances in a theatrical presentation such as an arena show.

History 
In March 2013, Feld Entertainment agreed with Marvel Entertainment to produce a Marvel Character-based live arena show. For nearly two years, development and engineering had been underway for the show. In October 2013, at New York Comic Con, Marvel and Feld revealed that the arena show would be Marvel Universe LIVE! In February 2014, the performers were cast and rehearsals began at Feld's facility in Ellenton. The cast was selected from a pool of Martial artists, aerial performers, X Games competitors and stunt people.

On July 10, 2014, Marvel Universe Live! premiered at the Tampa Bay Times Forum with showing there until July 13. The show has an initial 85-city national tour. The show's world premiere followed on August 13 at New York City's Barclays Center.  After Tampa, Florida and New York City, the show stayed on the east coast which includes stops at Washington D.C., Philadelphia, Nashville, Miami, and Atlanta.

A new Marvel Universe Live! show, "Age of Heroes", was announced by Feld in May 2017. The tour had a soft launch in New Orleans from June 23–25 before heading out West for the summer. Age of Heroes debuted at the Staples Center in Los Angeles on July 7, 2017.  Then Age of Heroes went to the Midwest in the fall follow by Canada and circling the USA until early 2019 when the show goes over seas.

Original show 

Thor shattered the cosmic cube, so it would not fall into dangerous hands. Loki moves to reform the cube in order to destroy the Earth. So, a worldwide race for the fragments is on.  The Avengers, Spider-Man and the X-Men work to stop Loki and the other involved super villains (Red Skull, Madame Hydra, Electro, Green Goblin and Doctor Octopus) to save the Earth.

Characters

Age of Heroes 

The Guardians of the Galaxy and the Avengers team up to help Doctor Strange retrieve the Wand of Watoomb from Yondu. Loki has hired Nebula to get the Wand for him. Guardians of the Galaxy are also after Nebula. The two teams meet in Asgard before uniting and travel to stop Loki and Nebula from ending the world with the wand.

See also 
Iron Man Experience
Marvel Experience
Marvel Super Heroes 4D
Spider-Man Live!

References

External links 

2014 plays
Feld Entertainment
Avengers (comics) in other media
Captain America in other media
Hulk (comics) in other media
Iron Man in other media
Thor (Marvel Comics) in other media
Spider-Man in live performances
X-Men in other media
Marvel Comics